Doina and Ion Aldea Teodorovici was a Moldovan musical duo consisting of married couple Doina and Ion Aldea Teodorovici. The group disbanded in 1992, after both members died in a road traffic accident in Coşereni. Today, there is a monument to them there, as well as another in Chişinău.

Members
Doina Aldea Teodorovici – born 15 November 1958 in Chişinău, died  in Coșereni. 
Ion Aldea Teodorovici – born 7 April 1954 in Leova, died  in Coșereni. He was a graduate of Moldova State University.

Awards 
 Order of the Republic, 1993 – Post mortem
 Artist Emerit din R. Moldova

Works 
 "Iona"
 "Disidentul"
 "Ce te legeni, codrule"
 "Fântână Anghelinei" – dram. A. Burac
 "Dragă, consăteanule" – dram. Gh. Malarciuc
 "Abecedarul" – dram. D. Matcovschi
 "Tata" – dram. D. Matcovschi
 "Pomul vietii" – dram. D. Matcovschi
A scris muzică instrumentală, "Rapsodie"; variaţii pentru pian, cvintet pentru coarde.

Bibliography
 Boris Parii. Ion şi Doina. Doina şi Ion. Album. Ch., FC "Basarabia", 1993
 Serafim Buzilă. Interpreţi din Moldova. Enciclopedie. Ch., Ed. Arc, Museum 1996; Reeditare 1999.
 Iurie Colesnic (Editor). Chişinău. Enciclopedie. 1997.
 Silvia Bogdănaş. Ion şi Doina vor fi eternizaţi în bronz. Flux. Cotidian Naţional. 1998, 29 iulie
 Eugenia Marin, Ion şi Doina. Flux. 1998, Oct 30
 Tudor Ţopa. Localităţile Moldovei. Enciclopedie. vol. 3. Chişinău
 Petru Soltan. Calendar Naţional. Biblioteca Naţională a Republicii Moldova. 2008
 Valerian Ciobanu-Vieru. Popas la Valea Adîncă. Chişinău. Pontos, 2005
 Valerian Ciobanu-Vieru. Să zbori din nou//Din lutul iubirii. Chişinău. Pontos. 2007, p. 15
 Gheorghe Ion Marin. Misiuni şi destine, Chişinău. Pontos. 2008
 Alex Găină. Гостинная: Форум: Глобальная демократическая волна: Стукачи) Гостинная: Форум: Глобальная демократическая волна: Стукачи)]
 Dictionar enciclopedic de nume proprii, Ed. Cartier, București- Chişinău, 2004

References

External links 
  Biografie
  
  Biografie Aldea Teodorovici Ion şi Doina 
  Doina & Ion Aldea Teodorovici Eminescu 
  Moartea soţilor Doina şi Ion Aldea Teodorovici
  Interviu cu Cristi Aldea–Teodorovici
  Ion si Doina Aldea–Teodorovici: viata de dupa moarte
  Galerie foto 

1992 deaths
Moldovan musical groups
Male–female musical duos
Married couples
Musical groups established in 1981
Musical groups disestablished in 1992
Popular Front of Moldova
Recipients of the Order of the Republic (Moldova)
Road incident deaths in Romania
Romanian nationalism in Moldova